George Holmes Gallie (17 September 1917 – 16 January 1944) was a Scotland international rugby union player, who played at prop.

Rugby Union career

Amateur career

He played for Edinburgh Academicals RFC.

Provincial career

He was capped for Edinburgh District.

International career

Death
Gallie, a major in the British Army, was killed in the Second World War at Minturno, Italy, during the First Battle of Monte Cassino in January 1944. He was serving with the 78th (Lowland) Field Regiment of the Royal Artillery at the time of his death.

Family

He was the son of Capt Robert Arthur Gallie, M C, (1893-1948), who represented Scotland at hooker in 1920.

See also
 List of Scottish rugby union players killed in World War II

References

Sources

 Bath, Richard (ed.) The Scotland Rugby Miscellany (Vision Sports Publishing Ltd, 2007 )
 Massie, Allan A Portrait of Scottish Rugby (Polygon, Edinburgh)

1917 births
1944 deaths
Scottish rugby union players
Scotland international rugby union players
Rugby union players from Edinburgh
People educated at Edinburgh Academy
British Army personnel killed in World War II
Edinburgh Academicals rugby union players
Edinburgh District (rugby union) players
Royal Artillery officers
Military personnel from Edinburgh
Rugby union props